Richard David-Caine (born 5 April 1987) is an English actor, writer and voiceover artist. Between 2013 and 2019 he played the character of Line in the CBeebies series Swashbuckle. He is also part of the key ensembles in the BBC comedies Horrible Histories and Class Dismissed; for the latter he was nominated in the 2017 and 2019 RTS Awards for Best Performance in a Comedy. In 2020, he co-created, wrote and starred in Big Fat Like, a comedy sketch show pastiching the Internet.

Early life 
David-Caine is from Ruislip, North-west London. He graduated from Mountview Academy of Theatre Arts in 2009 with a BA (Hons) in Acting. 
He states one of his idols as comedian Sacha Baron Cohen. He identifies as vegan.

Career 
In 2009, David-Caine set up his own comedy group, Four Screws Loose, along with Joseph Elliott, Conan House and Thom Ford. The group performed five shows in successive years at the Edinburgh Festival Fringe, as well as performing at Bestival, Latitude Festival, Underbelly Southbank Festival, Brighton Fringe and Adelaide Fringe Festival. They were selected as New Act of the Year (NATYS: New Acts of the Year Show) finalists 2013 and featured on BBC Radio 4’s Sketchorama and BBC Radio 1’s Fun and Filth Cabaret. The group’s style revolved around high energy routines, physical comedy and audience interaction and garnered mostly positive reviews.

David-Caine’s first lead TV role came when he was cast as one half of the comedy double act Cook and Line on CBeebies’ new pirate gameshow, Swashbuckle. The show proved popular and lead to other appearances on the channel including A Midsummer Night’s Dream, The Tempest (RSC co-productions) and the annual Christmas shows. David-Caine was also selected as part of the core cast in BAFTA-winning comedy sketch show, Horrible Histories. As well as this, he’s starred in all five series of BBC mockumentary, Class Dismissed.

In 2017 he developed, wrote and starred in his own internet comedy series, InterNOT, alongside his comedy partner, Joseph Elliott. The show satirises YouTube and cameos David-Caine’s characters from Class Dismissed, Mark and Mrs Mark. Other notable work includes BBC Three sitcoms Dead Air (as character, Hardip) and People Just Do Nothing (as Chabuddy G’s boss, Sam).

David-Caine voices a variety of characters in CBBC comedy, The Zoo and Entertainment One's animated series Ricky Zoom.

Filmography

Television

References

1987 births
Living people